Rivière, La Rivière, or Les Rivières (French for "river") may refer to:

Places

Belgium
 Rivière, Profondeville, a village

Canada
 La Rivière, Manitoba, a community
 Les Rivières (Quebec City), a borough

France
 La Rivière, Gironde
 Rivière, Indre-et-Loire
 La Rivière, Isère
 Rivière, Pas-de-Calais
 La Rivière, Réunion, home of the SS Rivière Sport football club

Other uses 
 Rivière, a style of necklace or bracelet
 "Riviere", a 2006 song by Deftones from Saturday Night Wrist

People with the surname 
 Anna Riviere (1810-1884) opera singer known by her married name of Anna Bishop
 Beatrice Rivière, French applied mathematician
 Briton Rivière (1840–1920), British artist
 Charles Marie Rivière (1845–?), French botanist abbreviated C.Rivière
 Daniel Riviere (1780-1846) artist and father of a family of noted artists and singers
 Émile Rivière (1835-1922), French archaeologist
 Emmanuel Rivière (born 1990), French footballer
 Georges Henri Rivière (1897–1985), French museologist
 Henri Rivière (naval officer) (1827–1883), French naval commander involved in the conquest of northern Vietnam
 Henri Rivière (painter) (1864–1951), French artist, designer and theatrical technician
 Henri Rivière (bobsleigh) (born 1922), French Olympic bobsledder
 Hugh Goldwin Rivière (1869–1956), British portraitist
 Jacques Rivière (1886–1925), French writer
 Jean-François Rivière (born 1977), French footballer
 Jérôme Rivière (born 1964), French politician and lawyer
 Joan Riviere (1883–1962), British psychoanalyst
 Joannès Rivière (1979), French chef, restaurateur and cookbook author
 Margarita Rivière (1944–2015), Spanish journalist and writer
 Marie Auguste Rivière (1821–1877), French botanist
 Osborne Riviere (born 1932), Dominican politician
 Paul Rivière (1912–1998), French Resistance fighter and politician
 Robert Riviere (1808–1882), English bookbinder
 Roger Rivière (1936–1976), French cyclist
 Roger-Arnould Rivière (1930–1959), French poet
 Romaine Rivière, birth name of Romaine-la-Prophétesse (born 1750), Haitian revolutionary
 Théonie Rivière Mignot  (1819–1875), American restaurateur
 Yohann Rivière (born 1984), French footballer

See also
 Rio (disambiguation)
 Rive (disambiguation)
 River (disambiguation)
 Rivers (disambiguation)
 La Rivière-de-Corps
 La Rivière-Drugeon
 La Rivière-Enverse
 Rivière-les-Fosses, a commune in the Haute-Marne département
 Rivière-Pilote, a commune in the Martinique overseas département
 Rivière-Saas-et-Gourby, a commune in the Landes département
 La Rivière-Saint-Sauveur
 Rivière-Salée, a commune in the Martinique overseas département
 Rivière-sur-Tarn, a commune in the Aveyron département
 Rivières, Charente, in the Charente département
 Rivières, Gard, in the Gard département
 Rivières, Tarn, in the Tarn département
 Les Rivières-Henruel, in the Marne département
 Rivières-le-Bois, in the Haute-Marne département
 Ríos (disambiguation)

French-language surnames